Makrešane is a village in the municipality of Kruševac, Serbia. According to the 2002 census, the village had a population of 1,618.

References

Populated places in Rasina District